Indu Bala  Goswami is an India politician and the state president of Bharatiya Janata Party (BJP)  of Himachal pradesh. She is a Member of Parliament in the Rajya Sabha, the upper house of Indian Parliament from Himachal Pradesh as a member of the  BJP. She was chairperson of the State Women Commission Himachal Pradesh and State Social Welfare Board Himachal Pradesh.

Political career

Indu Goswami joined the BJP in 1988, she had been working as a party worker for a long time and had worked with Prime Minister Narendra Modi in the late 80s as the vice-president of Bharatiya Janata Yuva Morcha.

Goswami has unsuccessfully contested the 2017 Himachal Pradesh Legislative Assembly election from Palampur against congress’ Ashish Butail.

In 2020 she was elected unopposed to the Rajya Sabha from Himachal Pradesh on BJP ticket.

References

Living people
Bharatiya Janata Party politicians from Himachal Pradesh
Rajya Sabha members from Himachal Pradesh
1967 births